The  was a conflict of the Sengoku period of Japan fought between Toyotomi Hideyoshi and Chōsokabe Motochika on the island of Shikoku in 1585. 
Hideyoshi invaded Shikoku with a force of over 100,000 men in June and led a campaign against the Chōsokabe clan force of 40,000 men for control over the island. Hideyoshi's army was successful and conquered most of Shikoku within two months, and defeated Chōsokabe when he surrendered Ichinomiya Castle in August.

Background
In the 1570s, Chōsokabe Motochika launched a campaign to personally unify Shikoku, the smallest of Japan's four main islands, and defeated a number of samurai rivals over the next decade. In 1580, Chōsokabe came into conflict with Oda Nobunaga after rejecting a request to submit to him. 

By 1583, Chōsokabe was the most powerful warlord on Shikoku and had conquered most of the island's four provinces of Iyo, Sanuki, Awa, and Tosa. That year, Chōsokabe had defeated Sengoku Hidehisa, a retainer of Nobunaga's successor Toyotomi Hideyoshi, at the Battle of Hiketa. By this point, Hideyoshi had become the most powerful warlord in Japan following the death of Nobunaga the previous year. Hideyoshi's position was insecure and his efforts were occupied on consolidating his rule on Honshu. 

In 1584, Hideyoshi won a political victory against Tokugawa Ieyasu at the Battle of Komaki and Nagakute, securing his position as paramount warlord. Hideyoshi began expanding his rule from outside his base in central Honshu and decided to invade Shikoku.

Invasion
In June, 1585, Hideyoshi amassed a giant army of 113,000 men to invade Shikoku and divided them into three forces. The first, under his half-brother Hashiba Hidenaga and nephew Hashiba Hidetsugu, consisted of 60,000 men, and assaulted the provinces of Awa and Tosa, approaching Shikoku via Akashi. The second force was led by Ukita Hideie, consisted of 23,000 men, and assaulted the province of Sanuki. The third force was led by Mōri "Two Rivers", Kobayakawa Takakage and Kikkawa Motoharu, consisted of 30,000 men, and advanced on the province of Iyo. In total, it took 600 larger ships and 103 smaller ships to transport Hideyoshi's army across the Seto Inland Sea to Shikoku.

Chōsokabe chose to fight to defend his territories with his force of 40,000 men, despite the overwhelming size of Hideyoshi's army and the suggestions of his advisors to submit. In June, Hideyoshi's army invaded Shikoku, winning a string of victories and securing many castles across the island over the next two months. By August, Hideyoshi's invasion culminated in the siege of Ichinomiya Castle, with around 40,000 men under Hidenaga besieging the castle for 26 days. Hidenaga managed to destroy the water source of Ichinomiya Castle, and Chōsokabe half-heartedly tried to relief the castle from siege, before Ichinomiya finally surrendered. With the surrender of the castle, Chosokabe Motochika himself surrendered.

Aftermath
Chōsokabe was allowed to keep Tosa Province but stripped of the three other provinces of Shikoku, which were then divided among Hideyoshi's generals. Awa was given to Hachisuka Iemasa and Akamatsu Norifusa, Sanuki was given to Sengoku Hidehisa and Sogō Masayasu, and Iyo was given to Kobayakawa Takakage and other Mōri generals. Chōsokabe submitted as a retainer and general of Hideyoshi, participating in the Kyūshū campaign and Japanese invasions of Korea, and later became known for his involvement in the San Felipe incident.

References

Shikoku
1585 in Japan
Conflicts in 1585
Shikoku 1585
Chōsokabe clan